Yevgeniy Afanasyevich Yevsyukov (born January 2, 1950, in Krasnoyarsk) is a retired race walker from Russia, who represented the Soviet Union at the 1980 Summer Olympics in Moscow, USSR. There he ended up in fourth place in the men's 20 km race, clocking 1:26.28,3.

International competitions

References
 
sports-reference

1950 births
Living people
Sportspeople from Krasnoyarsk
Russian male racewalkers
Soviet male racewalkers
Olympic athletes of the Soviet Union
Athletes (track and field) at the 1980 Summer Olympics
World Athletics Championships athletes for the Soviet Union
World Athletics Championships medalists
Honoured Coaches of Russia